"All for You" is the debut single by American alternative rock band Sister Hazel, originally appearing on their eponymous debut album. In 1997, the song was re-recorded for their second album, ...Somewhere More Familiar. It became their signature song, peaking number 11 on the US Billboard Hot 100, number two on Canada's RPM Top Singles chart, and number 10 in Iceland. It also charted in Australia at number 50 for two non-consecutive weeks. The song was used in the trailer for the 1998 movie The Object of My Affection.

Track listings
US and European CD single
 "All for You" – 3:39
 "All for You" (live version) – 5:57
 "Wanted It to Be" (live version) – 5:40

US 7-inch vinyl
A. "All for You"
B. "Happy"

Charts

Weekly charts

Year-end charts

All-time charts

References

1994 songs
1997 debut singles
Sister Hazel songs
Universal Records singles